BibTeX is reference management software for formatting lists of references. The BibTeX tool is typically used together with the LaTeX document preparation system. The name is a portmanteau of the word bibliography and the name of the TeX typesetting software.

The purpose of BibTeX is to make it easy to cite sources in a consistent manner, by separating bibliographic information from the presentation of this information, similarly to the separation of content and presentation/style supported by LaTeX itself.

Basic structure
In the words of the program's author Oren Patashnik:

Here's how BibTeX works. It takes as input

BibTeX chooses from the .bib file(s) only those entries specified by the .aux file (that is, those given by LaTeX's  or  commands), and creates as output a .bbl file containing these entries together with the formatting commands specified by the .bst file [..].                                                                 LaTeX will use the .bbl file, perhaps edited by the user, to produce the reference list.

History
BibTeX was created by Oren Patashnik and Leslie Lamport in 1985. It is written in WEB/Pascal.

Version 0.98f was released in March 1985.

With version 0.99c (released February 1988), a stationary state was reached for 22 years.

In March 2010, version 0.99d was released to improve URL printing. Further releases were announced.

Reimplementations
During the period following BibTeX's implementation in 1985, several reimplementations have been published:

BibTeXu
A reimplementation of bibtex (by Yannis Haralambous and his students) that supports the UTF-8 character set. Taco Hoekwater of the LuaTeX team criticized it in 2010 for poor documentation and for generating errors that are difficult to debug.
bibtex8 
A reimplementation of bibtex that supports 8-bit character sets.
CL-BibTeX 
A completely compatible reimplementation of bibtex in Common Lisp, capable of using bibtex .bst files directly or converting them into human-readable Lisp .lbst files.  CL-BibTeX supports Unicode in Unicode Lisp implementations, using any character set that Lisp knows about.
MLBibTeX 
A reimplementation of BibTeX focusing on multilingual features, by Jean-Michel Hufflen.
BibLaTeX 
A complete reimplementation. "It redesigns the way in which LaTeX interacts with BibTeX at a fairly fundamental level. With biblatex, BibTeX is only used to sort the bibliography and to generate labels. Instead of being implemented in BibTeX's style files, the formatting of the bibliography is entirely controlled by TeX macros." It uses the bibliography processing program Biber and offers full Unicode and theming support.
Bibulous
A drop-in BibTeX replacement based on style templates, including full Unicode support, written in Python.

Bibliographic information file
BibTeX uses a style-independent text-based file format for lists of bibliography items, such as articles, books, and theses.  BibTeX bibliography file names usually end in .bib. A BibTeX database file is formed by a list of entries, with each entry corresponding to a bibliographical item.  Entry types correspond to various types of bibliographic sources such as article, book, or conference.

An example entry which describes a mathematical handbook would be structured as an entry name followed by a list of fields, such as author and title:
@Book{abramowitz+stegun,
 author    = "Milton {Abramowitz} and Irene A. {Stegun}",
 title     = "Handbook of Mathematical Functions with
              Formulas, Graphs, and Mathematical Tables",
 publisher = "Dover",
 year      =  1964,
 address   = "New York City",
 edition   = "ninth Dover printing, tenth GPO printing"
}
If a document references this handbook, the bibliographic information may be formatted in different ways depending on which citation style (APA, MLA, Chicago etc.) is employed.  The way LaTeX deals with this is by specifying   commands and the desired bibliography style in the LaTeX document.  If the command  appears inside a LaTeX document, the bibtex program will include this book in the list of references for the document and generate appropriate LaTeX formatting code.  When viewing the formatted LaTeX document, the result might look like this:

 Abramowitz, Milton and Irene A. Stegun (1964), Handbook of mathematical functions with formulas, graphs, and mathematical tables.  New York: Dover.

Depending on the style file, BibTeX may rearrange authors' last names, change the case of titles, omit fields present in the .bib file, format text in italics, add punctuation, etc.  Since the same style file is used for an entire list of references, these are all formatted consistently with minimal effort required from authors or editors.

The types of entries and fields used in virtually all BibTeX styles BibTeX are listed below.

Entry types
A BibTeX database can contain the following types of entries:

 article An article from a journal or magazine.Required fields: author, title, journal, year, volumeOptional fields: number, pages, month, doi, note, key
 book A book with an explicit publisher.Required fields: author/editor, title, publisher, yearOptional fields: volume/number, series, address, edition, month, note, key, url
 booklet A work that is printed and bound, but without a named publisher or sponsoring institution.Required fields: titleOptional fields: author, howpublished, address, month, year, note, key
 conference The same as inproceedings, included for Scribe compatibility.
 inbook A part of a book, usually untitled. May be a chapter (or section, etc.) and/or a range of pages.Required fields: author/editor, title, chapter/pages, publisher, yearOptional fields: volume/number, series, type, address, edition, month, note, key
 incollection A part of a book having its own title.Required fields: author, title, booktitle, publisher, yearOptional fields: editor, volume/number, series, type, chapter, pages, address, edition, month, note, key
 inproceedings An article in a conference proceedings.Required fields: author, title, booktitle, yearOptional fields: editor, volume/number, series, pages, address, month, organization, publisher, note, key
 manual Technical documentation.Required fields: titleOptional fields: author, organization, address, edition, month, year, note, key
 mastersthesis A master's thesis.Required fields: author, title, school, yearOptional fields: type, address, month, note, key
 misc For use when nothing else fits.Required fields: noneOptional fields: author, title, howpublished, month, year, note, key
 phdthesis A Ph.D. thesis.Required fields: author, title, school, yearOptional fields: type, address, month, note, key
 proceedings The proceedings of a conference.Required fields: title, yearOptional fields: editor, volume/number, series, address, month, publisher, organization, note, key
 techreport A report published by a school or other institution, usually numbered within a series.Required fields: author, title, institution, yearOptional fields: type, number, address, month, note, key
 unpublished A document having an author and title, but not formally published.Required fields: author, title, noteOptional fields: month, year, key

Field types
A BibTeX entry can contain various types of fields. The following types are recognized by the default bibliography styles; some third-party styles may accept additional ones:
address
Publisher's address (usually just the city, but can be the full address for lesser-known publishers)
annote
An annotation for annotated bibliography styles (not typical)
author
The name(s) of the author(s) (in the case of more than one author, separated by and)
booktitle
The title of the book, if only part of it is being cited
Email
The email of the author(s)
chapter
The chapter number
crossref
The key of the cross-referenced entry
doi
digital object identifier
edition
The edition of a book, long form (such as "First" or "Second")
editor
The name(s) of the editor(s)
howpublished
How it was published, if the publishing method is nonstandard
institution
The institution that was involved in the publishing, but not necessarily the publisher
journal
The journal or magazine the work was published in
key
A hidden field used for specifying or overriding the alphabetical order of entries (when the "author" and "editor" fields are missing).  Note that this is very different from the key (mentioned just after this list) that is used to cite or cross-reference the entry.
month
The month of publication (or, if unpublished, the month of creation)
note
Miscellaneous extra information
number
The "(issue) number" of a journal, magazine, or tech-report, if applicable. Note that this is not the "article number" assigned by some journals.
organization
The conference sponsor
pages
Page numbers, separated either by commas or double-hyphens.
publisher
The publisher's name
school
The school where the thesis was written
series
The series of books the book was published in (e.g. "The Hardy Boys" or "Lecture Notes in Computer Science")
title
The title of the work
type
The field overriding the default type of publication (e.g. "Research Note" for techreport, "{PhD} dissertation" for phdthesis, "Section" for inbook/incollection)
volume
The volume of a journal or multi-volume book
year
The year of publication (or, if unpublished, the year of creation)

In addition, each entry contains a key (Bibtexkey) that is used to cite or cross-reference the entry. This key is the first item in a BibTeX entry, and is not part of any field.

Style files
BibTeX formats bibliographic items according to a style file, typically by generating TeX or LaTeX formatting commands.  However, style files for generating HTML output also exist. BibTeX style files, for which the suffix .bst is common, are written in a simple, stack-based programming language (dubbed "BibTeX Anonymous Forth-Like Language", or "BAFLL", by Drew McDermott) that describes how bibliography items should be formatted. There are some packages which can generate .bst files automatically (like custom-bib or Bib-it).

Most journals or publishers that support LaTeX have a customized bibliographic style file for the convenience of the authors. This ensures that the bibliographic style meets the guidelines of the publisher with minimal effort.

Uses
 Astrophysics Data System – The NASA ADS is an online database of over eight million astronomy and physics papers and provides BibTeX format citations.
 BibDesk – Open-source software application for macOS for creating, editing, managing, and searching BibTeX files.
 BibSonomy – A social bookmark and publication management system based on BibTeX.
 Citavi – Reference manager. Works with various TeX-Editors and supports BibTeX input and output.
 CiteSeer – An online database of research publications which can produce BibTeX format citations.
 CiteULike (discontinued) – A community based bibliography database that had BibTeX input and output.
 The Collection of Computer Science Bibliographies – uses BibTeX as internal data format, search results and contributions primarily in BibTeX.
 Connotea – Open-source social bookmark style publication management system.
 Digital Bibliography & Library Project – A bibliography website that lists more than 910,000 articles in the computer science field.
 Google Books – The bibliographic information for each book is exportable in BibTeX format via the 'Export Citation' feature.
 Google Scholar – Google's system for searching scholarly literature provides BibTeX format citations if the option is enabled in 'Scholar Preferences'.
 Google Research – Housed within the artificial intelligence division of Google is a compilation of publications by Google staff with BibTeX citation links.
 HubMed – A versatile PubMed interface including BibTeX output.
 INSPIRE-HEP – The INSPIRE High-Energy Physics literature database provides BibTeX format citations for over one million high-energy physics papers.
 JabRef – Open-source cross-platform software application for creating, editing, managing, and searching BibTeX and BibLaTeX files.
 MathSciNet – Database by the American Mathematical Society (subscription), choose BibTeX in the "Select alternative format" box
 Mendeley – Reference manager, for collecting papers. It supports exporting collections into bib files and keep them synchronized with its own database.
 Pandoc – Open-source document converter that can read a BibTeX file and produce formatted citations in any bibliography style specified in a citation style language (CSL) file.
 Qiqqa – Software application for Windows that includes a fully featured BibTeX editor and validator, along with tools for automatically populating BibTeX records for PDFs.
 refbase – Open-source reference manager for institutional repositories and self archiving with BibTeX input and output.
 RefTeX – Emacs based reference manager.
 Wikindx – Open-source virtual research environment/enhanced bibliography manager including BibTeX input and output.
 Wikipedia – Pressing cite this page on the side of an article provides a BibTeX format citation.
 Zentralblatt MATH – Database by the European Mathematical Society, FIZ Karlsruhe and Heidelberg Academy (subscription, 3 free entries); choose BibTeX button or format.
 Zotero – Open-source reference manager with advanced features such as synchronization between different computers, social bookmarking, searching inside saved PDFs and BibTeX output.

See also

Data schemes
 EndNote – a text-based data scheme used by the EndNote program
 refer – an aging text-based data scheme supported on UNIX-like systems
 RIS – a text-based data scheme from Research Information Systems
 Bebop – a web-based front-end interface for BibTeX

Other
 Citation Style Language – a newer XML-based bibliography style specification analogous to BibTeX's .bst files
 Comparison of reference management software
 List of TeX extensions

References

External links

CTAN: Package bibtex official site
bibtex.org third-party site.
BibTeXing. The original manual (1988) by the co-author of BibTeX, Oren Patashnik.
Managing Citations and Your Bibliography with BibTeX by Jürgen Fenn (The PracTeX Journal 2006, number 4).
BibTeX tutorial. Section from Getting to Grips with LaTeX tutorials.

 
Bibliography file formats